Rodrigo Domingos dos Santos or simply Rodrigo Paraná (born January 25, 1987 in Nossa Senhora do Livramento), is a Brazilian footballer.

Career 
He joined K League 2 side Bucheon FC and became the first foreign player in the club's history.

References

External links

1987 births
Living people
Brazilian footballers
Brazilian expatriate footballers
K League 2 players
J2 League players
Londrina Esporte Clube players
Ceilândia Esporte Clube players
Rio Claro Futebol Clube players
União Recreativa dos Trabalhadores players
Esporte Clube São Bento players
Bucheon FC 1995 players
V-Varen Nagasaki players
Giravanz Kitakyushu players
Rodrigo Parana
Associação Atlética Internacional (Limeira) players
Expatriate footballers in South Korea
Brazilian expatriate sportspeople in South Korea
Expatriate footballers in Japan
Brazilian expatriate sportspeople in Japan
Association football midfielders